Jochen Piest (born 1964 in Bad Honnef; died 1995 in Tscherwljonnaja) was a German correspondent for the German newsmagazine Stern.

Life 
On 10 January 1995, Piest was killed in a suicide attack by a Chechen rebel against a Russian mine-clearing unit in the village of Chervlyonna, about 24 kilometers northeast of the Chechen capital, Grozny. Piest was fatally hit by three bullets, while a Rossiskaya Gazeta correspondent Vladimir Sorokin was wounded in the attack. The gunman died when the locomotive collided with the military train.

References

1964 births
1995 deaths
German reporters and correspondents
German male journalists
Journalists killed while covering the Chechen wars
War correspondents of the Chechen wars
German male writers